Gahi (also Romanized as Gāhī; also known as Gāvi) is a village in Bu ol Kheyr Rural District, Delvar District, Tangestan County, Bushehr Province, Iran. At the 2006 census, its population was 540, in 120 families.

References 

Populated places in Tangestan County